Isha Sharvani is an Indian-Australian contemporary dancer and actress. She is known for her stylistic Indian contemporary and aerial dance performances. She has also starred in Bollywood, Malayalam and Tamil movies.

Early life
Isha was born in Gujarat, India as the eldest daughter of acclaimed danseuse Daksha Sheth and Australian musician father Dev Issaro from Perth. She lived in Ahmedabad, from where she moved to Delhi, Vrindavan and Bangalore, before settling down in Trivandrum. She has a younger brother named Tao Issaro, who is a noted percussionist.

Isha's parents founded an arts school called Academy for Art Research, Training and Innovation (AARTI) in Trivandrum, Kerala, where she lived for 13 or 14 years. At the age of thirteen, she began formal learning in dance from her mother Daksha Sheth at her dance school and learned Kalaripayattu, Kathak and Chhau dance as well as giving performances in 22 countries over last seven years. 

According to an interview with India Daily, Isha stated she "lived a different life poles apart from the film industry. For 11 years I have been training eight to 10 hours a day in a very disciplined atmosphere where there is no distinction between boys and girls. I was not supposed to cry over a clipped nail. Beyond stage even my wardrobe has mostly unisexual dresses, jeans and T-shirts". She is a trained Malkam dancer, a type of folk dance.

Career

Isha never gave acting in films much priority, until she was spotted by filmmaker Subhash Ghai, who required someone with dancing skills to perform in his movie Kisna (2005). He offered her a main role in the film opposite Vivek Oberoi. The film did not do well. She was also the dancer opposite Hritik Roshan in the Parle Hide & Seek commercial, performing a much appreciated dance duet with Hrithik Roshan.

Since then she has continued her dance performances on stage, as well as signing for several movies which were released in 2006 and 2007. She appeared as a female lead in the Hindi comedy Darwaza Bandh Rakho in 2006.

She is currently the lead dancer in the Daksha Sheth Dance Company, and has performed in front of live audiences throughout the world, including Mumbai, London, Perth and Muscat.

In 2012, Isha was a participant in the dance reality show, Jhalak Dikhhla Jaa Season 5, which was aired on Colors TV and earned acclaim for her dance performances in the show.

In 2013, she played the titular role as a housebreaker in the Malayalam short film Esha, a part of the anthology 5 Sundarikal.

In 2014, Sharvani played the lead role in the Malayalam film Iyobinte Pustakam, as an Anglo-Indian illegitimate child of a British landlord and an ethnic tribal Indian mother.

In 2015, Sharvani played the titular role in the Malayalam movie Double Barrel.

Filmography

Reality television
As contestant

See also
List of Indian film actresses

References

External links

Daksha Sheth Dance Company official website

Living people
Actresses from Gujarat
Actresses from Thiruvananthapuram
Actresses from Perth, Western Australia
Indian film actresses
Australian film actresses
Actresses in Hindi cinema
Actresses in Gujarati cinema
Actresses in Malayalam cinema
Actresses in Tamil cinema
Gujarati people
Indian female dancers
Australian female dancers
Indian people of Australian descent
Australian actresses of Indian descent
Australian expatriate actresses in India
Indian contemporary dancers
Year of birth missing (living people)
21st-century Indian actresses
21st-century Australian actresses